Drake Milligan (born June 1, 1998) is an American actor and singer best known for portraying Elvis Presley on the CMT series Sun Records and starred in a film called “Nobody” where he portrayed a young teen Elvis. But more recently, for his appearances on American Idol and America's Got Talent.

Biography
Drake Milligan was born in Mansfield, Texas on June 1, 1998 to James & Angela Milligan. He was inspired by the country music his father listened to, particularly Merle Haggard, as well as an Elvis impersonator he saw sing at a nearby restaurant. After performing locally as an Elvis impersonator himself, Milligan answered a casting call by CMT for the role of Elvis Presley in their TV series Sun Records. He ended up landing the part, which required him to move from Texas to Nashville, Tennessee during his senior year of high school.

Milligan competed on American Idol in 2018 but ultimately dropped out. "I decided that I wasn't quite ready for that platform yet, and that it would be a better step for me to move to Nashville and focus on my music first," he said.

While in Nashville, Milligan also auditioned for a recording contract with BBR Music Group. After initially rejecting him, the label signed him six months later. In July 2021, he released his self-titled debut extended play, which was produced by Tony Brown. On October 22, 2021, he released the Christmas song “Cowgirl for Christmas.”

Milligan and his band appeared on America's Got Talent on June 8, 2022, receiving four enthusiastic "yes" votes for his performance of an original song, "Sounds Like Something I'd Do." Drake finished the season in 3rd place on September 14, 2022.

Milligan's debut album, Dallas/Fort Worth was released on September 15, 2022.

Discography

Studio albums

Extended plays

Singles

References

American country singers
BBR Music Group artists
Country musicians from Texas
Elvis impersonators
Living people
American Idol participants
America's Got Talent contestants
1998 births